Rochester is a surname. Notable people with the surname include:

 Ajay Rochester (born 1969), Australian actress and author
 Anna Rochester (1880–1966), American labor researcher and Communist political activist
 George Rochester (1908–2001), English physicist
 John Rochester (disambiguation), several persons
 Nathaniel Rochester (1752–1831), American Revolutionary War soldier and land speculator, founder of Rochester, New York
 Nathaniel Rochester (computer scientist) (1919–2001), designed the IBM 701, wrote the first assembler and participated in the founding of the field of artificial intelligence
 Paul Rochester (born 1938), American football player
 Robert Rochester (c. 1494 – 1557), English Roman Catholic and employee of Queen Mary I
 Thomas H. Rochester (1797–1874), the 6th son of Colonel Nathaniel Rochester and the 6th mayor of Rochester
 William B. Rochester (1789–1838), American lawyer and politician from New York

Fictional characters:
 Edward Rochester, character in the novel Jane Eyre